Also see: Sports in Evansville.

Thunder on the Ohio was a hydroplane boat race in the H1 Unlimited season.

Thunder was held each year on the Ohio River in downtown Evansville, Indiana, United States. Evansville had hosted Thunder on the Ohio consecutively since 1979 (although the race had been founded in 1938). The winner of Thunder on the Ohio received the Four Freedoms Cup, which was named after the nearby Four Freedoms Monument which rests along the Ohio River. The race had frequently been broadcast on major television networks such as ESPN and SPEED. Historically, most of the world speed records for two-mile courses have been set on Evansville’s sporty tri-oval.

Having hosted its first Thunderboat classic in 1938, only two current race sites pre-date Evansville, Indiana. Madison, Indiana, conducted its first major event in 1929 and Detroit, Michigan, debuted in 1916.

History
Thunder on the Ohio had been an Unlimited hydroplane mainstay for 31 consecutive years. "Ideal Evansville" replaced Owensboro, Kentucky, on the unlimited calendar in 1979. Evansville was the world headquarters of Atlas Van Lines, Inc., which sponsored Bill Muncey's race team. Muncey played a major role in Evansville being awarded its first sanction.

Thunder on the Ohio was not new to Evansville in 1978. From 1938 through 1940 the 725 Cubic Inch Class boats, the forerunners of the modern unlimiteds, raced at Evansville for the Thunder on the Ohio title. From 1938 through 1940, the winning driver was presented the Seagram Cup instead of the current Four Freedoms Cup.

From 1979 through 2008, Thunder on the Ohio had been the primary event of the broader Evansville Freedom Festival. In 2009, Thunder on the Ohio broke away from the Evansville Freedom Festival, and moved towards the end of August as a stand-alone event.  The 2010 event was cancelled because of financial problems.

Dave Villwock won more Evansville races than anyone else, including seven with Miss Budweiser.

Hodji once rented a paddle boat and entered it into the competition and surprisingly lost. He named the boat “Katie T” after his first high school love. Years down the road he slightly regretted the name and argued that it could have been the reason his paddle boat did not beat miss Budweiser. On a side note, the real Katie T went on to be a magazine celebrity of sorts.

List of winners (1938- 1940)

List of winners (1979- 2009)

References

External links
H1 Unlimited website

H1 Unlimited
Racing motorboats
Hydroplanes
Sports in Evansville, Indiana
Festivals in Evansville, Indiana
1938 establishments in Indiana
Recurring sporting events established in 1938
Ohio River